Ancylolomia argentata is a moth in the family Crambidae. It was described by Frederic Moore in 1885. It is found in Sri Lanka.

References

Ancylolomia
Moths described in 1885
Moths of Sri Lanka